Sough  is a hamlet, in Lancashire, England.

Sough is located east of the main A56 road between Earby and Kelbrook; it is in the area known as West Craven in the district of Pendle.

This area used to be part of Earby Urban District in the West Riding of Yorkshire until boundary changes in 1974.

See also
 Kelbrook and Sough

Listed buildings in Kelbrook and Sough

Towns and villages in the Borough of Pendle
Hamlets in Lancashire